Camp Elmore may be:

 Camp Elmore, Florida
 Camp Allen